Allagelena koreana is a species of spider in the family Agelenidae. It was first described by Paik in 1965 as Agelena koreana. It is native to China and Korea. It was transferred to the genus Allagelena in 2011.

References

Agelenidae
Spiders of Asia
Spiders described in 1965